Morley railway station is a bus and railway station under construction as part of the Metronet Morley–Ellenbrook Line, serving the Perth suburbs of Bayswater, Embleton and Morley. It is to be built in the median strip of Tonkin Highway at Broun Avenue.

History
A passenger railway through Morley, branching from the Midland line at Bayswater, was included in the 1955 Stephenson-Hepburn Report. However, the government did not incorporate it into the Metropolitan Region Scheme derived from the report when it was adopted in 1963.

A railway station at Morley was later proposed in the lead up to the 2013 election by the opposition Labor Party as part of their Metronet scheme. The station, which would have been served by the plan's Ellenbrook, Wanneroo, and Northern Circle lines, would have been located in Tonkin Highway near Walter Road.

In 2016, the Barnett Government proposed an underground line to Morley from Perth station, with an underground station at the Galleria Shopping Centre. Conversely, in the lead up to the 2017 election, the opposition Labor Party largely retained their 2013 proposal for an above-ground station at Morley on a line to Ellenbrook in their modified Metronet program.

The McGowan Government finalised the present location of the station at Broun Avenue in August 2019.

Station design
Morley station will be built in the median strip of Tonkin Highway at Broun Avenue. It will have a bus interchange built on a bridge parallel to Broun Avenue, similar to that of Bull Creek and Murdoch railway stations. As part of the construction of the station, the Broun Avenue bridge will be rebuilt. The bus interchange will have 12 bus stands, and feature a high frequency route to Morley bus station, among others. There will be two lifts and two stairs down to platform level, one of each on either side of the Broun Avenue bridge. Other station facilities include a kiosk, toilets, and secure bicycle shelters.

There will be a multi-storey car park built south of the station, with 400 car bays. Access to the car park will be via Wotton Street. As part of the construction of the car park, the Bayswater Skate Park will have to be relocated. Possible locations for the new skate park include Broun Park and Joan Rycroft Reserve.

Services
Morley station will be served by Transperth trains operating along the Morley–Ellenbrook Line between Perth and Ellenbrook, and Transperth buses. It is projected that a rail journey to Perth will take 15 minutes. Morley station is in fare zone 2. The station is projected to have 1,365 passenger boardings per day in 2031.

References

External links
 Morley–Ellenbrook Line on the Metronet website.

Morley, Western Australia
Morley–Ellenbrook line
Proposed railway stations in Perth, Western Australia
Transperth railway stations in highway medians